Marc Marie Max Aillet (born 17 April 1957) has been the bishop of Bayonne since 30 November 2008. He had previously served as vicar general of the diocese of Fréjus-Toulon.

Biography
Aillet was born in 1957 in Parakou, Benin. He studied classics in Paris. He entered the Medicine faculty for a year before entering the major seminary in Genoa. He was ordained a priest on 3 July 1982 for the diocese of Genoa by Cardinal Giuseppe Siri.

He was a student at the University of Friburg, where he completed a licence in moral theology with a thesis entitled: "Lire la Bible avec saint Thomas – Le passage de la "lettera" à la "res" dans la Somme Théologique".

He returned to France where he was incardinated in the diocese of Fréjus-Toulon where he worked as a chaplain at the college of Saint-Raphaël. He served as a professor of moral theology in the major seminary of Toulon from 1985-1992.  After this, he was responsible for the formation of priestly students in the diocese of Blois. He served as parish priest of Saint-Raphaël from 1998–2002 and since 2001 he served as an episcopal vicar and from 2002 vicar general of the diocese of Fréjus-Toulon. He was elected Cathedral canon in 2003. 

He was appointed as the bishop of Bayonne by Pope Benedict on 15 October 2008 and was consecrated and installed on 30 November 2008 with Cardinal Jean-Pierre Ricard, archbishop of Bordeaux as his Principal Consecrator with Bishop Pierre Jean Marie Marcel Molères and Bishop Dominique Marie Jean Rey of Fréjus-Toulon serving as the principal co-consecrators.

Bishop Aillet wishes to increase the number of Tridentine Masses in his diocese and established a weekly Latin Mass in Bayonne. He celebrated ordinations in the church of Saint-Eloi, Bordeaux, personal parish of the Institute of the Good Shepherd in January 2010. 

In April 2010, Bishop Aillet gave a talk entitled The Wounded Liturgy in which he described the "desacralisation" of the liturgy.

On 21 March 2017, it was reported on the television channel France 2 and by Mediapart, that Bishop Marc Aillet had been concealing for six years the existence of a pedophile priest in his diocese. On 23 March, the bishop gave an interview, also reported in La République des Pyrénées in which he admitted the facts, and provided an explanation. The interview was also reported on 23 March 2017 by France Bleu

See also
 Catholic Church in France
 List of the Roman Catholic dioceses of France
List of Bishops in France

References

External links
The Wounded Liturgy

 

1957 births
Living people
Bishops of Bayonne
People from Parakou
Beninese Roman Catholic bishops
21st-century Roman Catholic bishops in France